Cyril Henry Golding-Bird (18 September 1876 – 9 April 1955) was an Anglican bishop in the early decades of the 20th century.

He was born on 18 September 1876 and educated at Merchant Taylors' and Lincoln College, Oxford. Ordained in 1897 he was initially a curate at All Saints, Margaret Street in London and then a missionary priest in South Africa.

After time as vicar of St Barnabas', Dover, he began a long period of service overseas: first as dean of the Falkland Islands; then a similar post in Newcastle, New South Wales following which he was ordained to the episcopate as Bishop of Kalgoorlie.

Translated to Mauritius in 1919, he returned to England eleven years later to become an Assistant Bishop of Guildford and Archdeacon of Dorking, then of Surrey, until his final resignation in 1949, before his death on 9 April 1955.

References

External links
All Saints Margaret Street

1876 births
People educated at Merchant Taylors' School, Northwood
Alumni of Lincoln College, Oxford
Anglican deans
20th-century Anglican bishops in Australia
Anglican bishops of Mauritius
Anglican bishops of Kalgoorlie
Archdeacons of Dorking
Archdeacons of Surrey
1955 deaths
Anglican missionaries in South Africa
British Mauritius people
English Anglican missionaries
Assistant bishops of Guildford
20th-century Anglican Church of Southern Africa bishops